The list of Honorary Doctors of Massey University below shows the recipients of honorary doctorates conferred by Massey University since 1962.

References

 

      
Massey
Lists of New Zealand people
New Zealand education-related lists